The Lights that Failed: European International History 1919–1933 is the first of two volumes on the political and diplomatic history of Europe between the World Wars (19191939) and is part of the Oxford History of Modern Europe series.

Synopsis
This first volume covers the period from the end of fighting in World War I and the multitude of peace treaties negotiated to end the conflict, to the disintegration of European financial systems as a result of the Great Depression and the rise of Adolf Hitler. Steiner weaves together two distinct threads of interwar historiography, security and economics, to create a "big picture" holistic view of this period of history, covering both great powers and smaller and emerging nations.

Steiner's narrative focuses mainly on the political and economic history of the period and its impact international relations. She focuses on the complex, unforgiving, and often harsh realities of nationalist economic and security policies and how they impacted the relationships between established and emerging European nations. One of Steiner's major contribution to the field of international history is her coverage of the lesser powers of Europe, such as those in Scandinavia and Eastern Europe, which are normally overlooked in works on the period, which are dominated by a great powers narrative and perspective.

The book is structured with two parts of unequal length. The first part of the work is on 1918 to 1929 and focuses on reconstruction of a "shattered" Europe after World War I. The second and shorter part is on what Steiner refers to as the "hinge years" of 1929 to 1933 ands focuses on the impact of the Great Depression in Europe, the failure of disarmament as a cornerstone of European security, and the surge of nationalism which upended the European international order. Steiner refers to those years as "hinge year" because she "determined that the doors of Europe that had swung open after the First World War – favouring a reduction of barriers within Europe with regard to the movement of goods, money, people and ideas – slammed firmly shut by 1933." Steiner also covers the impact of the Japanese invasion and occupation of Manchuria on internal and external European relations. The book concludes with a chronology of international events between 1919 and 1933 and an extensive bibliography of primary and secondary sources.

Academic reception 
"Among the many virtues of Steiner’s masterly synthetic account are a wide geographic range, with an extensive treatment of Central Europe and the Balkans; a command of the very extensive monographic literature, with judicious summings up and verdicts on the often ferocious microhistoriographical debates; beautiful vignettes of the leading politicians and diplomats; and an ability to bring together the economic and security aspects of European politics." Harold James, Princeton University.

"A magisterial narrative history, thorough, comprehensive, wide-ranging, well organized, cautious, balanced in judgement, objective in tone, and (insofar as any book of this size, complexity, and detail can be) readable."

"Its publication ... emphatically affirms Zara Steiner's status as the pre-eminent historian of inter-war international affairs."

Academic reviews

Release information 
 Hardcover: 2005 (1st Edition), Oxford University Press, 938pp. .
 Paperback: 2007 (1st Edition), Oxford University Press, 938pp. .

Series information
 
 
The Lights that Failed is part of the Oxford History of Modern Europe and is the first of two volumes authored by Steiner for the series, the second being the follow up The Triumph of the Dark: European International History 1933-1939. The series is edited by Alan Bullock and William Deakin.

Similar or related works
 The Origins of the Second World War by A.J.P. Taylor (1961).
 The Struggle for Mastery in Europe 1848–1918 by A.J.P. Taylor (1954).
 The Third Reich Trilogy by Richard J. Evans (2003, 2005, 2008).
 The Twenty Years' Crisis by E. H. Carr (1939).

About the author
 
 
Zara Steiner (6 November 192813 February 2020) was an American-born British historian and academic. Steiner specialised in foreign relations, international relations, 20th century history of Europe and of the United States. Richard J. Evans has described her two volumes in the Oxford History of Modern Europe (The Lights That Failed and The Triumph of the Dark) as the "standard works" on international diplomacy between the two world wars. She was elected as a fellow of the British Academy and also served as Acting President of the University of Cambridge.

See also
 Paris Peace Conference (1919–1920)
 Aftermath of World War I
 Interwar period
 International relations (1919–1939)

References

Notes

Citations

External links
 The Lights that Failed: European International History 1919–1933 by Zara Steiner, Oxford University Press.
 The Oxford History of Modern Europe series, Oxford University Press.

2005 non-fiction books
History books about Nazism
History books about nationalism
History books about politics
Books about economic history
History books about ethnic groups
History books about interwar Europe
History books about international relations
Oxford University Press books
20th-century history books